Angry Machines is the seventh studio album by American heavy metal band Dio. It was released first in Japan on September 23, 1996, by Mercury Records with 11 tracks and in the US on October 15, 1996 on Mayhem Records but with only 10 tracks. It was the last studio album to feature original drummer Vinny Appice.

Reissue
In 2019, Angry Machines was remastered and announced for reissue in 2020. While the first disc is identical to the original North American and European releases, the second disc contains live tracks recorded on various dates of the Angry Machines tour. The track "God Hates Heavy Metal", exclusive to Japanese pressings of the album, was not included in the reissue. This song however, was released as a standalone 12 inch single for Record Store Day in 2021, featuring "This is Your Life" and a live version of "Hunter of the Heart" as B sides.

Track listing
All lyrics by Ronnie James Dio, music as stated.

Disc two of the deluxe version was recorded live on the Angry Machines tour in 1996/97. It contains the same recordings as the live album Inferno: Last in Live, omitting "Mistreated/Catch the Rainbow" and switching up the order of the tracks. Track 3 is incorrectly labeled as "Double Monday" only.

Personnel
Dio
Ronnie James Dio – vocals
Tracy Grijalva (a.k.a. Tracy G) – guitars
Jeff Pilson – bass
Vinny Appice – drums
Scott Warren – keyboards

Production
Recorded and mixed at Total Access Recording in Redondo Beach, California
Produced by Ronnie James Dio
Engineered by Wyn Davis
Second engineered by Darian Rundall and Eddie Ashworth
Originally mastered by Eddy Schreyer at Oasis Mastering
Cover illustration by Paul Gregory

Charts

References

External links 
Angry Machines song lyrics

1996 albums
Dio (band) albums
SPV/Steamhammer albums